Gerontissa Gavrielia (Elder Gabriela), also known as Mother Gavrielia (15 October 1897 – 28 March 1992) was a Greek Orthodox nun, known for her care of the poor and sick. She was the second woman to be admitted to a Greek university and was a trained physiotherapist prior to taking up her religious calling at the age of 60.

Biography
Avrilia Papayannis was born on 15 October (2 October O.S.) 1897 N.S. in Constantinople in the Ottoman Empire as the youngest child of Helias and Victoria Papayannis, a wealthy Greek family. She grew up in Constantinople and lived there until her family was deported during the 1923 population exchange between Greece and Turkey and sent to Thessaloniki. She entered the Aristotle University of Thessaloniki, becoming the second woman ever admitted to a Greek university, where she earned a degree in philosophy. She had previously graduated with a degree in botany at a Swiss university. In 1932, she moved to Athens and cared for nursing home residents until 1938 when she moved to England to study podiatry and physiotherapy, where she remained until the end of World War II.

Career
In 1945, Papayannis returned to Greece and began working with the American Farm School and Friends Relief Service in Thessaloniki, until 1947, when she moved to Athens and opened a physiotherapy practice. For a decade she operated her office using funds from her paying clients to provide assistance to the poor. Upon the death of her mother, in 1954, she took a vow of poverty and gave all her worldly possessions away. The following year, she moved to India to work with the poor and assist Baba Amte in his work with leper communities in India. After four years of providing free physiotherapy to the poor, Papayannis went to the Himalayan Mountains, spending eleven months in solitude as a hermit. She then traveled to Landour where she met an American woman, who arranged for her to go to the monastery headed by Father Theodosius in Bethany, in the Holy Land in 1960. She arrived at the Bethany Community of the Resurrection of the Lord and after accepting tonsure became a nun. After her three-year novitiate, Papayannis took the name Gavrielia.

Sister Gavrielia was sent to the Taizé Community in France by the Patriarch Athenagoras I of Constantinople, though her assignment there was brief. She was then sent to the United States, where she toured ethnic Greek communities in seventeen states and accompanied many mentally ill patients to psychiatric hospitals in Europe. After nearly a decade of touring, speaking, and helping the sick, she was sent to East Africa for three years to do missionary work. Following a brief assignment in Germany, Sister Gavrielia was sent back to India, where she remained for three years. In 1979, she was given use of an Athens apartment and became a "Gerontissa" (elder), counseling disciples and helping the sick over the next ten years. Near the end of her life, she retreated to a hermitage in Aegina, but when she developed Hodgkin's disease she returned to Athens. After a miraculous healing, she left Athens two years before her death and moved to the island of Leros. Gerontissa Gavrielia died on Leros on 28 March, 1992.

Legacy 
In 1996 a biography of her life entitled I Askitiki tis Agapis was published in Greek, in 1999 the book was translated into English, and in 2000 into Russian. It has since had 14 Greek editions, 2 English editions, and has been translated into Arabic, French and Serbian.

Notes

References

Bibliography 

1897 births
1992 deaths
20th-century Greek women
Aristotle University of Thessaloniki alumni
Greek physiotherapists
20th-century Eastern Orthodox nuns
Aesthetics
People from Istanbul in health professions
Constantinopolitan Greeks